Soyuz TM-3 was the third crewed spaceflight to visit the Soviet space station Mir, following Soyuz T-15 and Soyuz TM-2. It was launched in July 1987, during the long duration expedition Mir EO-2, and acted as a lifeboat for the second segment of that expedition. There were three people aboard the spacecraft at launch, including the two man crew of the week-long mission Mir EP-1, consisting of Soviet cosmonaut Aleksandr Viktorenko and Syrian Muhammed Faris. Faris was the first Syrian to travel to space, and as of June 2021, the only one. The third cosmonaut launched was Aleksandr Aleksandrov, who would replace one of the long duration crew members Aleksandr Laveykin of Mir EO-2. Laveykin had been diagnosed by ground-based doctors to have minor heart problems, so he returned to Earth with the EP-1 crew in Soyuz TM-2.

Soyuz TM-3 landed near the end of December 1987, landing both members of the EO-2 crew, as well as potential Buran pilot Anatoli Levchenko, who had been launched to Mir a week earlier aboard Soyuz TM-4.

Crew

Mission parameters
Mass: 7100 kg
Perigee: 297 km
Apogee: 353 km
Inclination: 51.6°
Period: 91.0 minutes

References

Crewed Soyuz missions
1987 in spaceflight
1987 in the Soviet Union
Soviet Union–Syria relations
1987 in Syria
Spacecraft which reentered in 1987
Spacecraft launched in 1987